Eulaira is a genus of North American dwarf spiders that was first described by Ralph Vary Chamberlin & Vaine Wilton Ivie in 1933.

Species
 it contains fourteen species and one subspecies:
Eulaira altura Chamberlin & Ivie, 1945 – USA
Eulaira arctoa Holm, 1960 – USA (Alaska)
Eulaira chelata Chamberlin & Ivie, 1939 – USA
Eulaira dela Chamberlin & Ivie, 1933 (type) – USA
Eulaira delana Chamberlin & Ivie, 1939 – USA
Eulaira hidalgoana Gertsch & Davis, 1937 – Mexico
Eulaira kaiba Chamberlin, 1949 – USA
Eulaira mana Chamberlin & Ivie, 1935 – USA
Eulaira obscura Chamberlin & Ivie, 1945 – USA
Eulaira schediana Chamberlin & Ivie, 1933 – USA
Eulaira s. nigrescens Chamberlin & Ivie, 1945 – USA
Eulaira simplex (Chamberlin, 1919) – USA
Eulaira suspecta Gertsch & Mulaik, 1936 – USA
Eulaira thumbia Chamberlin & Ivie, 1945 – USA
Eulaira wioma Chamberlin, 1949 – USA

See also
 List of Linyphiidae species (A–H)

References

Araneomorphae genera
Linyphiidae
Spiders of North America